Terri Blackstock (born December 7, 1957 in Belleville, Illinois) is a Christian fiction writer.

Writing
In 1994 Blackstock was writing for publishers such as HarperCollins, Harlequin and Silhouette, when a spiritual awakening drew her into the Christian market. Since that time, she’s written over thirty Christian titles, in addition to the thirty-two she had in the secular market.

In addition to her suspense novels, she has written a number of novels in the women’s fiction genre, including Covenant Child, which was chosen as one of the first Women of Faith novels, and her “Seasons” books written with Beverly LaHaye, wife of Tim LaHaye.

Blackstock asked her fans for advice on what they would title one of her books. This novel used to be one of her secular books, but it was dear to her, so she decided that she was going to rewrite it to be fitting for the Christian market. The four choices for the title were Pros and Cons, Truth-Stained Lies, Shadow in Serenity and Black Sheep. Shadow in Serenity won and was released in September 2011.

Published books

These books alone are not serial novels:
 Emerald Windows (2001)
 Seaside (2001)
 The Gifted Sophomores (2002)
 The Heart Reader of Franklin High (2008)
 The Listener: What if you could hear what God hears? (2008)
 Double Minds (2009)
 Predator (2010)
 Shadow in Serenity (2011)
 Covenant Child (2012)

Fiction series 

The Sun Coast Chronicles
 Evidence of Mercy (1995)
 Justifiable Means (1996)
 Ulterior Motives (1996)
 Presumption of Guilt (1997)

Second Chances
 Never Again Good-bye (1996), reprinted
 When Dreams Cross (2000), reprinted
 Blind Trust (2000), reprinted
 Broken Wings (2000), reprinted

Newpointe 911
 Private Justice (1998)
 Shadow of Doubt (1998)
 Word of Honor (1999) 
 Trial by Fire (2000)
 Line of Duty (2003)

Seasons, co-written with Beverly LaHaye
 Seasons Under Heaven (2001)
 Showers in Season (2001)
 Times and Seasons (2002)
 Season of Blessing (2003)

Cape Refuge
 Cape Refuge (2002)
 Southern Storm (2003)
 River's Edge (2005)
 Breaker's Reef (2005)

Restoration
 Last Light (2006)
 Night Light (2006)
 True Light (2007)
 Dawn's Light (2008)

Intervention
 Intervention (2010)
 Vicious Cycle (2011)
 Downfall (2012)

Moon Lighter
 Truth Stained Lies (2013)
 Distortion (2014)
 Twisted Innocence (2015)

If I Run
 If I Run (2016)
 If I'm Found (2017)
 If I Live (2018)

References

External links
 
 Terri Blackstock at the Internet Book List
 

1957 births
20th-century American novelists
American women novelists
Living people
Christian novelists
21st-century American novelists
20th-century American women writers
21st-century American women writers
People from Belleville, Illinois
Novelists from Illinois